Jacinth or hyacinth is a yellow-red to red-brown variety of zircon used as a gemstone.

In Exodus 28:19, one of the precious stones set into the hoshen (the breastplate worn by the High Priest of Israel) is called, in Hebrew, leshem, which is often translated into English as "jacinth". The true identity of this stone has been a source of confusion since at least the first century; the modern identification of leshem with jacinth seems to have been popularised by Martin Luther, who may in turn have been following a fourth-century tradition.

In Revelation 21:20, one of the foundation stones of the New Jerusalem is hyacinth (Greek: hyakinthos). However, Strong's Concordance and Thayer's Greek Lexicon describe this as a stone of the colour of the hyacinth plant, i.e. dark blue. The stone intended may be the sapphire. In Revelation 9:17, the word appears in adjective form (hyakinthinous, "hyacinthine"); this, again, is thought to be descriptive of a blue or purple colour, with no reference to the modern jacinth stone.

References

Zirconium minerals
Gemstones